Camille Paulus  (born 24 April 1943) is a Belgian lawyer and liberal politician.

Education
He graduated with a doctorate in law at the Vrije Universiteit Brussel (VUB) in 1966.

Career
He succeeded Frans Van den Eynde as the mayor of Aartselaar in 1989. Paulus was a Law Professor at the Vrije Universiteit Brussel, mayor of Aartselaar, and President of the Liberaal Vlaams Verbond (1982–1993). He was governor of the Belgian province of Antwerp from 1 October 1993 until 30 April 2008.

References

Sources
 Camille Paulus (Liberal Archive)
 S. Heylen, B. De Nil, B. D'hondt, Bart (e.a.), Geschiedenis van de provincie Antwerpen. Een politieke biografie. 2. Biografisch repertorium, Antwerpen, Provinciebestuur Antwerpen, 2005, p. 143–144.

1943 births
Living people
Governors of Antwerp Province
Flemish activists
Free University of Brussels (1834–1969) alumni
People from Aartselaar
Mayors of places in Belgium